Armley Park is a large public park located next to Stanningley Road in Armley, on the outskirts of Leeds, in West Yorkshire, Northern England.

The park stretches from Armley down the hill to the Leeds and Liverpool Canal, near the canal the park turns to dense woodland.

On its north-west side Armley Park borders Gotts Park, which is designated as a Grade II Park and Garden. It is named after industrialist Benjamin Gott and contains his former home, Gotts Park Mansion, now the clubhouse of Gotts Park Golf Club.

Armley Park has many amenities, including football pitches, tennis courts, bowling greens, a children's playground and gardens. There are also several Grade II listed features including the gate piers at the entrance on Stanningley Road, the war memorial, and the fountain and associated plaques.

See also
Listed buildings in Leeds (Armley Ward)

References

External links

Armley
Listed buildings in Leeds
Parks and commons in Leeds
Tourist attractions in Leeds
Grade II listed buildings in West Yorkshire